Smithfield is a historic home and farm and national historic district located near Rosedale in Russell County, Virginia, United States. The district encompasses 13 contributing buildings and 5 contributing sites. The main house dates to the 1850s, and is a two-story, five-bay, central passage plan, brick Greek Revival style dwelling.  Among the other buildings in the district are a brick spring house, a brick acetylene house, frame meat house, a former school house, frame horse barn, frame sheep barn, cow barn, a milking parlor, and a shop.  The contributing sites include an earlier house seat, three cemeteries, and the site of a slave house.

It was listed on the National Register of Historic Places in 1994.

References

Houses on the National Register of Historic Places in Virginia
Farms on the National Register of Historic Places in Virginia
Historic districts on the National Register of Historic Places in Virginia
Greek Revival houses in Virginia
Houses in Russell County, Virginia
National Register of Historic Places in Russell County, Virginia
U.S. Route 19